Arnaldo Freitas (born August 6, 1952) is a Portuguese former footballer who played as a defender.

Career 
Arnaldo played at the youth level with Sp. Madeira in 1967. In 1974, he played in the Segunda Divisão with C.S. Marítimo, and assisted in securing promotion to the Primeira Divisão in 1977. In 1978, he returned to the Segunda Divisão to play with C.D. Montijo, and later with Académico Viseu, and C.D. Nacional. In 1982, he returned to the Primeira Divisão to play with Amora F.C. and played three seasons with the club. In 1986, he played abroad in the National Soccer League with Toronto First Portuguese.

References  

1952 births
Living people
Association football defenders
Portuguese footballers
C.S. Marítimo players
C.D. Montijo players
Académico de Viseu F.C. players
C.D. Nacional players
Amora F.C. players
Toronto First Portuguese players
Primeira Liga players
Segunda Divisão players
Canadian National Soccer League players
Portuguese expatriate footballers
Expatriate soccer players in Canada
Portuguese expatriate sportspeople in Canada